Anatrachyntis gerberanella is a moth in the family Cosmopterigidae. It was described by Henry Legrand in 1965, and is known from the Seychelles.

References

Moths described in 1965
Anatrachyntis
Moths of Africa